Hygiene and the Assassin (lit. "The Assassin's Hygiene") is the first novel by the Belgian novelist Amélie Nothomb. It was published in 1992 by Albin Michel. The novel is written almost entirely in dialogue.

Plot
The famous novelist Prétextat Tach is stricken by "Elzenveiverplatz syndrome" (an imaginary syndrome invented by the author), a cancer of the cartilage, and has only two more months to live. Almost immediately, many journalists rush to interview Tach for a scoop. However, after the first few interviews, the reader realizes that Tach is an obese and obnoxious misanthrope of the worst kind: acerbic, intolerant, a provocateur and a misogynist, who cannot tolerate any questions about his private life and has the audacity to turn the interviews into a cesspool of disgust for his interviewers. Thus, all the interviews fall short, until Nina, a relatively unknown journalist becomes the latest victim of the novelist. Unlike all the other journalists before, however, this journalist is a woman, so that the interview quickly takes the form of a confrontation between the journalist and the Nobel literature prize laureate. In a locked room full of mysteries, she will challenge the odious misogyny of Tach and, as the questions and answers wear on, confront Tach with the demons of his former life. By the end of the story, the novelist is revealed to be a murderer with a strange obsession about the filthiness he thinks puberty brings upon girls and turns them into adult women, and how his spirit will live on even in death. Nina ends up strangling Tach, mirroring a scene in Tach's book.

Film adaptation
The novel was adapted for film by François Ruggieri in 1999. It starred Jean Yanne as Prétextat Tach, Barbara Schulz as Nina, as well as Catherine Hiegel, Sophie Broustal, Jean Prat and Richard Gotainer.

There are some differences between the novel and the film. The film omits the entire chapter where four journalists are expelled by the writer and adds a police investigation. Prétextat Tach is less disgusting than in the book. A character, left for dead in the novel, has survived in the film.

References 

1992 Belgian novels
French-language novels
Novels by Amélie Nothomb
Novels about writers
Belgian novels adapted into films
1992 debut novels
Éditions Albin Michel books